Horst Hermann Heinrich Niendorf (28 June 1926 – 17 June 1999) was a German actor and voice actor. He appeared in more than ninety films from 1951 to 1996.

Selected filmography

References

External links 

1926 births
1999 deaths
German male film actors
German male television actors
German male voice actors
20th-century German male actors